The 710th Special Operations Wing is the rapid deployment force of the Philippine Air Force (PAF), which is divided into ten-man airborne attack teams as most of its members are airborne qualified.

The wing also controls the 772nd Explosives Ordnance Disposal Squadron and the 773rd K-9 Squadron.

It is the successor to the Philippine Army Air Corps Regiment, raised in late 1941 out of the pilots and air crews of the PAAC who took part in the Battle of Bataan.

Tasks
The mission of the 710th Special Operations Wing include the following:

 Conduct contingency operations against hostile elements and civilian mass actions.
 Coordination of air strikes.
 Explosive Ordnance Disposal operations; K-9 and handler training on explosives and bomb detection
 Civil disturbance control
 Honor/ceremonial functions of the Philippine Air Force.

Originally based in Villamor Air Base, the wing was transferred to Clark Air Base to assist the 600th Air Base Wing in its security requirements.

Overview
The unit serves as the Air Force's workhorse in dealing with special operations and supports the AFP's thrust for intensified Internal Security Operations (ISO).  In line with its mission, the elite group of combatants has accomplished numerous ISO related tasks for the first quarter of this year.  With the occurrence of bomb scares and terrorist attacks heightening in the country, the Wing has conducted a total of 919 K-9 paneling operations to different PAF bases and installations as well as routine paneling to different AFP installations including civilian offices and agencies.

Operations
In 2005, total of 13 detachments of Explosive Ordnance Disposal (EOD) personnel from the 710th responded to bomb threats at the request of concerned citizens from Angeles City to as far as Jolo, Sulu. 

In February of 2005, the wing also conducted Interoperability operations with the elements from 202nd Bde and 15th Strike Wing last February, in the First District of Batangas. In the same month, personnel from the 750th Combat Group conducted a joint ACTAF, NAKTAF, PACER and NCRPO in Cubao, Quezon City which resulted in the rescue of kidnap victim Kenshi Yu, and the apprehension of Mitchelle Yap Gumabao  a.k.a. Dennis Roldan.  

The 710th SPOW Combat Groups have been involved in environmental protection operations through the conduct of anti-illegal logging operations within the AORs (areas of responsibility) of Batangas, Cavite and Quezon provinces. 

The unit also conducts civil-military and humanitarian operations. During the unit's 13th Foundation Anniversary on 2 July 2004 the wing conducted Military Civic Action Activities which included administering anti-polio vaccines to 65 children in Brgy. Calumpang, Mabalacat, Pampanga and medical and dental civic action program (MEDCAP) for the 1,628 residents of Calaca, Batangas.  Other civil-military operations which benefited thousands of residents from different areas in the country were also conducted earlier that year.  These operations bring the Wing closer to the people, and helps build trust and confidence and respect for the AFP as a whole.

The 710th SPOW was involved in responding to the Manila Peninsula Mutiny after being called in to rein in renegade soldiers led by Antonio Trillanes IV.

Units
 720th Special Operations Group based in Col Jesus Villamor Air Base, Pasay.
 730th Combat Group located at Nasugbu, Batangas
 740th Combat Group located in Fernando Air Base, Lipa City. It is the first combat group of the 710th SPOW. The original design of the 740th was to be a task group known as balangay. Later it has been assigned as a combat group.
 750th Combat Group located in Camp Emilio Aguinaldo, Quezon City. It is the main component of NCR Command to subdue any hostile acts in the vicinity of Metro Manila and nearby provinces. With a rapid deployment capability they can be on site within matter of minutes which was proven in the "peninsula siege marines stand off". They are also capable on civil military operations conducting white area operations and civic actions even in disaster and relief operation during typhoons Milenyo, Glenda, and Ondoy.
 760th Combat Group based in Basa Air Base were already dissolved as of April 2012.
 770th Special Operations Combat Support Group based in Clark Air Base, Angeles City.

References

Citations

Bibliography
 Article about the 710SPOW, PAF.
 Online FAQ about the 710SPOW, PAF.
 Special Operations Forces Online Database

Special forces of the Philippines
Airborne units and formations
Military units and formations of the Philippine Air Force
Air force special forces units